, also known as This is Him, is a romance manga written and illustrated by Pom. It was serialized digitally through Line Manga in 2019–2021 as a weekly series, and is collected in tankōbon print volumes by Ichijinsha since 2021. The story follows a love triangle involving Makoto Hanaoka, a cross-dresser; Saki Aoi, a bisexual younger student; and Ryūji Taiga, a childhood friend of Makoto's. Senpai is an Otokonoko received an official English translation by Webtoon beginning on March 9, 2023.

Pom created the series with themes such as love regardless of gender, and originally came up with the concept based on how they had difficulties in drawing male characters. The series was popular with readers and well received by critics for its writing and characters, becoming the third-place web manga winner of the 2021 Next Manga Award and the third most read Line Manga series of 2021.

Premise
Senpai is an Otokonoko is a romance manga following , a young man who dresses like a woman despite his mother's disapproval. , a girl attending the same high school as Makoto, falls in love with him under the belief that he is a woman, and only learns the truth after confessing her feelings for him and getting rejected. She is bisexual and does not mind what his gender is, and still wishes to become his first love, but he worries that she will be seen as odd by associating with a cross-dresser. , a childhood friend of Makoto's, is initially unsure about being with another man, but a love triangle involving the three forms as he warms up to it.

Production
Senpai is an Otokonoko was written and illustrated by Pom, and originated in how they had difficulties drawing male characters, and received advice from an acquaintance to draw a series where a male character dresses like a woman; prior to this, they had considered making a series about a lesbian romance. Due to their difficulty with male characters, they had to dedicate a lot of time to the panel where Makoto shows that he is not a girl, and in the end still remained unhappy with it. The setting was designed around Makoto's cross-dressing, with a school where female students wear sailor fuku, ensuring visual contrast against the male school uniform. Although Japanese high schools allowing male students to wear female school uniforms do exist, the one Makoto attends was not modeled after any specific real-world schools.

Early in the planning of the manga, Pom considered making it a gag-based comedy, but decided to lean more toward a serious tone as that is what they personally enjoy reading, which is what led them to write Makoto's troubled relationship with his mother. Among the major themes are human relationships, love regardless of gender, the importance of respecting diversity, being able to like cute things as a man, and the importance of taking care of oneself, although Pom did not specifically write the story with the intent to combat prejudices against people who defy gender norms. They did not want the story to feel dark, so they were conscious about balancing darker scenes with lighter ones.

Pom intentionally kept the story focused on just three main characters, saying that they dislike when a manga's cast grows while its story gets less focused and goes off on tangents. Makoto and Saki were designed to contrast against each other, with Makoto being an anxious person who does not move much, and Saki being a confident person who always moves; Ryūji was created as a balance between the two. They used voice actress Tomoko Kaneda as reference for Saki's movements, and conceived of her as a proactive, immature girl who always is true to herself. When writing and drawing Makoto, they were conscious of how Makoto only dresses like a woman because he likes the aesthetic, and so intended to portray him as male on the inside. They intentionally tried to limit the amount of text in the series, and instead used visual storytelling whenever possible. As Pom had only intended for the series to last for 16 chapters, they did not have a detailed plan for how to continue the story after that, and let it go wherever the characters took it after planning out backgrounds for them; they thought that they could not portray things believably unless they had experienced it themselves, and described the characters as all having parts of the author within them.

Release
The manga began as the four-page story Otokonoko ga Kōhai ni Kokuhaku Sareru Hanashi, which Pom re-drew and expanded for a pilot in Line Manga's "frontier debut program" for independent creators in December 2019, and got signed for weekly digital serialization within four months of the premiere. The series ended with chapter 100 on December 30, 2021; Pom had considered continuing it further, but wanted to end it at a high point and not stretch it out.

A first tankōbon volume collecting the series in full color along with a new 16-page chapter was released on November 25, 2021 by Ichijinsha; Pom thought it would be difficult to prepare the series for print as it was originally created for a vertically scrolling digital format, and considered abandoning the idea, but proceeded because of reader requests. Webtoon began serializing the series digitally in other regions in 2021 as This is Him, with a Taiwanese release beginning on December 25, 2021, and a Chinese release on December 27. In addition to Thai and South Korean releases on February 13, 2022, and February 19,  The series has also been released in English by Webtoon beginning on March 9, 2023.

Volumes

Reception
Senpai is an Otokonoko was well received by critics and readers, and was the third-place winner of the 2021 Next Manga Award in the web manga category. It rose in popularity in 2020, and became the third most read series on Line Manga of 2021, after Mayu Murata's Honey Lemon Soda and Yaongyi's True Beauty. It was the third highest ranked in AnimeJapan's 2021 survey about what manga series published in the preceding year that readers would like to see adapted into anime, and the highest ranked in 2022.

The writing was well received for discussing potentially heavy topics like sexuality while managing to keep a light tone; Oricon and Nijimen both thought it did a good job at portraying the characters' psychology, and their struggles in wanting to be open about themselves while fearing the vulnerability that comes with it. Da Vinci wrote that they knew they loved the series when reading the chapter 31 line "does it have to be one or the other?", and found the portrayal of Makoto's situation at home with his disapproving mother and how it affects his loneliness profound; they recommended the manga to everyone regardless of age or gender. Critics liked the characters, with Magmix calling Makoto appealing and cute, and the cast as a whole depicted in a humanistic way, and Da Vinci finding themselves invested in the characters' relationships. Reviewing the manga for Model Press, Kira Yokoyama recommended it to readers who like coming-of-age stories and school settings, finding the story fresh and interesting, with well-written portrayals of the characters' feelings, and an appealing protagonist who is both cute and cool. The artwork was also well received, with both Oricon and Nijimen describing the coloring as beautiful, and Da Vinci calling the scene where Makoto reveals his gender particularly well drawn.

Notes

References

External links
  
  

2019 webcomic debuts
2021 webcomic endings
Bisexuality-related fiction
Coming-of-age anime and manga
Coming-of-age webcomics
Cross-dressing in anime and manga
Ichijinsha manga
Japanese comedy webcomics
LGBT in anime and manga
LGBT-related webcomics
Romance webcomics
Romantic comedy anime and manga
School life in anime and manga
Webcomics in print
2010s LGBT literature